Geraldino may refer to:

 Geraldino (footballer) (Geraldo Antônio Martins; 1940-2018), Brazilian footballer
 José Augusto Geraldino (born 1971), Dominican judoka
 Vicbart Geraldino (born 1978), Dominican judoka

See also
 Geraldine (disambiguation)